InteGreat Theater, formerly known as Words, Signs & Vibes (WS&V), is a performing arts independent youth theatre which aims towards working with integrating the deaf and hearing communities through drama and sign songs. The youth theatre meets at the Hippodrome Theatre in Birmingham, United Kingdom on Saturday afternoons.

They started as a part of the Leaveners, a Quaker performing arts group, alongside their other two groups, Quaker Music Making and Quaker Youth Theatre. After gaining popularity at various events, such as the Big Youth Theatre Festival (BYTF) and receiving the Wavemakers Award, the youth theatre split from its parent organisation due to financial issues, becoming and Independent Voluntary Organisation. The group formerly met at the Crescent Theatre before September 2008, when the group moved to the Hippodrome.

Organisation
The theater is led primarily by two drama leaders, Angela Twigg and Jayne Fletcher, who after working as drama leaders while the group was a member of the Leaveners, since moved to save the group from disbanding by forming it into an independent organisation in its own right.

The drama leaders are helped in workshops and projects by volunteer workers and interpreters to aid with communication with sign language.

References

External links
 InteGreat Theater (Facebook)

Theatre companies in Birmingham, West Midlands
Youth theatre companies
Deafness arts organizations
Disability organisations based in the United Kingdom
Disability theatre